Irene J. F. de Jong (born 1957) is a classicist and professor of Ancient Greek at the University of Amsterdam. She is known for her pioneering work on narratology and Ancient Greek literature. She is a Fellow of the British Academy.

Career 
Irene de Jong was born in Leiden in 1957. She studied at the University of Amsterdam from 1978 until 1982, and taught Classics at the Stedelijk Gymnasium in Utrecht in 1982–83. In 1984 she worked as a research fellow at the Thesaurus Linguae Graecae. She wrote her dissertation, 'Narrators and focalizers: the presentation of the story in the Iliad''', at the University of Amsterdam under a grant from the Netherlands Organisation for Scientific Research (NWO) from 1985 until 1987. She then continued to work at the University of Amsterdam, first as a postdoc and later as a research fellow.

Since 2002 she has held the chair of Ancient Greek at the University of Amsterdam.

De Jong has been member of the Academia Europaea since 2007. In 2015, De Jong was also selected as member of the Royal Netherlands Academy of Arts and Sciences. In 2019 she was elected a foreign member of the Humanities and Social Sciences Division of the Norwegian Academy of Science and Letters. She was elected as a Fellow of the British Academy in 2022.

 Selected publications 

 Narrators and focalizers: the presentation of the story in the Iliad. Amsterdam 1987. Nachdruck Amsterdam 2004
 Narrative in drama: the art of the Euripidean messenger-speech. Leiden 1991 (Mnemosyne Supplement 116)
 with J. P. Sullivan: Modern critical theory and classical literature. Leiden 1994 (Mnemosyne Supplement 130)
 A Narratological Commentary on the Odyssey. Cambridge 2001
 Studies in ancient Greek narrative. Vol. 1: Narrators, narratees, and narratives in ancient Greek literature. Leiden 2004 (Mnemosyne Supplement 257)
 with Albert Rijksbaron: Sophocles and the Greek language: aspects of diction, syntax and pragmatics. Leiden 2006 (Mnemosyne Supplement 269)
 Studies in ancient Greek narrative. Vol. 2: Time in ancient Greek literature. Leiden 2007 (Mnemosyne Supplement 291)
 Studies in ancient Greek narrative. Vol. 3: Space in ancient Greek literature. Leiden 2012 (Mnemosyne Supplement 39)
 Homer Iliad Book XXII. Cambridge 2012
 I classici e la narratologia. Guida alla lettura degli autori greci e latini''. Roma 2017.

References

External links 

1957 births
Living people
University of Amsterdam alumni
Academic staff of the University of Amsterdam
Dutch classical scholars
Women classical scholars
People from Leiden
Scholars of ancient Greek literature
Members of Academia Europaea
Members of the Norwegian Academy of Science and Letters
Members of the Royal Netherlands Academy of Arts and Sciences